William Hall is an  American actor, director, trainer and mask maker in San Francisco, California. He is the editor of The Playbook, Improv Games for Performers. 
 
Hall first became involved in acting when he took a drama class while attending Maggie L. Walker High School in Richmond, Virginia. He went on to obtain a Bachelor of Fine Arts in Acting from Boston University, where he was classmates with Geena Davis. After graduation, Hall came to San Francisco to pursue theater.

He has appeared in film and television including The Right Stuff, Twisted, Howard the Duck and Midnight Caller. He was one of the Nazis in the final ark scene in Raiders of the Lost Ark. 
 
Hall is one of the founding members of BATS Improv, an improvisational theatre, and the last remaining “OB” (original brother) of Fratelli Bologna.

Filmography

Notes
The Improv Playbook – 370 games for improv performers

External links

 Fratelli Bologna Official site
BATS Improv Official Site
The Improv Playbook – 370 games for improv performers
 The Power of Theater Games
How Well do Executives Trust Their Intuition - Chapter 10 co-authored with Rebecca Stockley

Year of birth missing (living people)
Living people
American directors
American male film actors
American male television actors
Place of birth missing (living people)
Boston University College of Fine Arts alumni
Maggie L. Walker Governor's School for Government and International Studies alumni